Ebrahim Javadipour  (born 28 July 1943) is a retired Iranian freestyle wrestler. He won a world title in 1969, 1970, 1971 and 1973 and a gold medal at the Asian Games in 1970 and 1974, but placed third at the 1972 Olympics. He is listed in the FILA wrestling hall of fame.

Javadi was born in Qazvin, but spent a few of his early years in Tehran, where his father worked for the Ministry of Labor. Javadi was an active child and tried various sports, eventually choosing wrestling because it fitted best to his relatively small body size.

References

External links
 

Olympic wrestlers of Iran
Wrestlers at the 1972 Summer Olympics
Iranian male sport wrestlers
Olympic bronze medalists for Iran
Living people
1943 births
Asian Games gold medalists for Iran
Olympic medalists in wrestling
Asian Games medalists in wrestling
Wrestlers at the 1970 Asian Games
Wrestlers at the 1974 Asian Games
People from Qazvin
World Wrestling Champions
Medalists at the 1970 Asian Games
Medalists at the 1974 Asian Games
Medalists at the 1972 Summer Olympics
20th-century Iranian people
21st-century Iranian people